12th Corps, Twelfth Corps, or XII Corps may refer to:

 12th Army Corps (France)
 XII Corps (Grande Armée), a corps of the Imperial French Army during the Napoleonic Wars
 XII (1st Royal Saxon) Corps, a unit of the Imperial German Army
 XII (Royal Saxon) Reserve Corps, a unit of the Imperial German Army
 XII Corps (India)
 XII Corps (North Korea)
 XII Corps (Ottoman Empire)
 XII Corps (Pakistan)
12th Rifle Corps (Soviet Union)
 XII Corps (United Kingdom)
 XII Corps (United States)
 XII Army Corps (Wehrmacht), a German unit World War II
 XII Corps (Union Army), a unit in the American Civil War

See also
List of military corps by number
12th Army Corps
 12th Army (disambiguation)
 12th Battalion (disambiguation)
 12th Brigade (disambiguation)
 12th Division (disambiguation)
 12th Group (disambiguation)
 12th Regiment (disambiguation)
 12 Squadron (disambiguation)